Ward Congregational Church, at 41 Modoc in Ward, Colorado, was built in 1894-95 and is listed on the National Register of Historic Places.

Also known as Ward Community Church, it was listed in 1989 as part of the "Metal Mining and Tourist Era Resources of Boulder County" multiple property submission.  In its nomination it was asserted to be architecturally significant "because of its intact design, materials and workmanship which are typical of the
building traditions of the period and make it an excellent example of the style of construction used for community buildings during this time in Boulder County."

References

Churches on the National Register of Historic Places in Colorado
Congregational churches in Colorado
National Register of Historic Places in Boulder County, Colorado